Aquarius is the debut studio album by the British progressive metal band Haken. Despite the band having released two previous demos, none of the multiple songs already recorded were re-released on this album. A 22-minute medley of the whole album, except for the song "Sun", was included in their live album L-1VE.

Aquarius was largely written on the piano by guitarist/keyboardist Richard Henshall and then developed with contributions from the rest of the band. Its track lengths are typical of progressive rock and progressive metal, with the shortest track being just under 7 minutes and the longest being nearly 17. It is a concept album about a mermaid, discovered by a fisherman and sold to a circus, whose blood is the only thing capable of saving the human race from a flood resulting from global warming issues. She ultimately dies for mankind's sake.

The album artwork was created by Dennis Sibeijn, who has also worked with 3, Job for a Cowboy, and See You Next Tuesday, among others.

The Story Of The Album 
The Point Of No Return

The album opens up with the song "The Point Of No Return". In the song we learn about a couple that is expecting a baby. In the birth of the child, the couple sees that the child is a mermaid and decides to throw the child into the sea.

Stream

In the song "Streams" we learn that the child from before is happy in the sea swimming with the fish. The song also uses harsh vocals to showcase the mermaid's insecurities.

Aquarium

The third song "Aquarium"  opens from the perspective of a fisherman who finds the mermaid while fishing. The fisherman captures the mermaid and puts her in his Aquarium for people to see. In the chorus, the mermaid shouts at the fisherman to release her. In the middle of the song we find out that the fisherman and the mermaid fell in love despite what he had done to her.

Eternal Rain

The song "Eternal Rain" takes the story to a darker tone, An approaching storm is threatening to end humanity and scientists found a way to save humanity that involves the mermaid. The fisherman also releases the mermaid.

Drowning In The Flood

In the fifth song "Drowning In The Flood" the storm is coming and causes a wave of destruction. Scientists have found a way to save humanity at the cost of her life and she accepts her fate. The fisherman hasn't taken it well and he is drowning in the flood while he is heartbroken.

Sun

The song "Sun" brings all the emotions to the front. The fisherman grieves over the mermaid's death thinking it was his fault that she died. He thinks that if he had never discovered her she might have lived. He thinks that maybe humanity would have found a different way to survive if he had not found her and that maybe humanity would have gone extinct but it would be worth it if she survives.

Celestial Elixir

The grand finale of the album "Celestial Elixir" tells us that her sacrifice worked. Her blood was able to create a cure that turns humans into mermaids giving them the ability to survive the flood. The life of the mermaid was a tragic one, the fisherman survives with only her memory.

Reception

The reception of this album was generally positive.

Eduardo Rivadavia of AllMusic praised it as the strongest prog album yet to come out in the 2010s. Classic Rock Magazine featured the song "Eternal Rain" as a free track of the day on 15 April 2010. The small review given was positive, calling it "interesting music from a young London band who combine jazz, metal and prog, delivered with excellent musicianship."

Track listing

Personnel

Haken
 Ross Jennings – vocals
 Richard "Hen" Henshall – guitar and keyboards
 Charlie Griffiths – guitar
 Thomas MacLean – bass guitar
 Ray Hearne – drums, tuba, djembe
 Diego Tejeida – keyboards

Additional musicians
 Craig Beattie – trombone
 Alex Benwell – trumpet
 Pablo Inda Garcia – clarinet
 Marged Hall – harp
 Darren Moore – trumpet
 Jon Roskilly – trombone
 Dave Ruff – flute
Production and design
 Misha Nikolic – recording 
 Tony Ashby – recording 
 Loz Anslow – recording 
 Christian Moos – mixing
 Eroc – mastering
 Dennis Sibeijn – artwork, design

References

External links
 [ AllMusic Guide to Aquarius]
 ProgArchives Aquarius page
 iTunes Aquarius page

2010 debut albums
Haken (band) albums